Valença railway station is the main railway station of Valença in the Norte Region, Portugal. It mainly serves regional and long-distance traffic towards Porto and northern Portugal, as well as connecting local services across the border to Galicia, Spain.

Services

References

Railway stations in Portugal
Valença, Portugal